Kōnan-ku may refer to:

 Kōnan-ku, Niigata (江南区)
 Kōnan-ku, Yokohama (港南区)